Doug Woolerton (born 17 May 1944) is a New Zealand politician who has been a member of the New Zealand First party since it was founded, and the National Party for a few years before that.

Early years
He was educated at Hamilton Boys' High School, and has a background in agriculture, having been a farmer for twenty-one years and director of a milk company for nine.

Political career
Woolerton was originally a member of the National Party. He stood for selection as the National candidate for the seat of Hamilton West in 1990, but lost to Grant Thomas, who was later elected to the seat. Woolerton left the National Party in 1992 to form the New Zealand First party with Winston Peters.

Member of Parliament

Woolerton first entered Parliament in the 1996 election, becoming a list MP after being ranked fifth on the New Zealand First party list. He remained an MP until his party lost all parliamentary seats in the 2008 general election.

He was the president of New Zealand First from the party's inception until 2005 when he resigned in protest against Winston Peters taking a visible role in the Labour-led government as Minister of Foreign Affairs. Later there were frictions between then New Zealand First president Dail Jones on the one hand, and Woolerton and Brian Donnelly on the other, over the latter's support for Sue Bradford's private members bill to outlaw parental corporal punishment of children (or smacking).

References

External links
 Doug Woolerton at the New Zealand Parliament website
 Doug Woolerton at the New Zealand First website
 Doug Woolerton on "They Work For You"
 Doug Woolerton talks about innovation and investment

1944 births
Living people
New Zealand farmers
New Zealand First MPs
New Zealand list MPs
Members of the New Zealand House of Representatives
Unsuccessful candidates in the 2008 New Zealand general election
New Zealand National Party politicians
21st-century New Zealand politicians
Place of birth missing (living people)